Reunited is an album released in 1996 by Highway 101. The album's title refers to the return of the band's original lead singer, Paulette Carlson, to the lineup. At the time, drummer Cactus Moser was not included in the lineup.

Included on it are four of the band's earlier singles, "The Bed You Made for Me", "Setting Me Up", "All the Reason Why" and "Walkin', Talkin', Cryin', Barely Beatin' Broken Heart". Two singles were released from the album, "Where'd You Get Your Cheatin' From" and "It Must Be Love."

Tracks 2, 5, 8, and 9 were produced by Paul Worley and Ed Seay, with Larry Butler producing the rest.

Track listing
"Where'd You Get Your Cheatin' From" (Paulette Carlson, Tom Shapiro, Chris Waters) — 3:10
"The Bed You Made for Me" (Carlson) — 3:26
"Holdin' On" (Christy Seamans, Curtis Stone) — 3:17
"Hearts on the Run" (Larry Butler, Jeff Sauls, Susan Sauls) — 3:53
"Setting Me Up" (Mark Knopfler) — 3:49
"She Don't Have the Heart to Love You" (Carlson) — 4:39
"Texas Girl" (Carlson, Gene Nelson, Jeff Pennig) — 3:04
"All the Reasons Why" (Carlson, Beth Nielsen Chapman) — 3:37
"Walkin', Talkin', Cryin', Barely Beatin' Broken Heart" (Roger Miller, Justin Tubb) — 2:34
"I've Got Your Number" (Tony Haselden, Harold Shedd) — 2:53
"It Must Be Love" (Stone, Debi Cochran) — 3:32
"Have You Ever Really Loved a Woman" (Bryan Adams, Michael Kamen, Robert John "Mutt" Lange) — 5:43

Personnel

Highway 101
 Paulette Carlson — vocals
 Jack Daniels — acoustic guitar, electric guitar, percussion, vocals
 Curtis Stone — bass guitar, mandolin, vocals

Additional musicians
 Larry Butler — keyboards
Larry Byrom — acoustic guitar, electric guitar
 Pete Bordinelli — acoustic guitar, gut string guitar, mandolin
 Gary Morse — pedal steel guitar, Dobro
 Bobby Ogdin — keyboards
 John Wesley Ryles — background vocals
 Tommy Spurlock — pedal steel guitar
 Steve Turner — drums

Technical
 Larry Butler — production (tracks 1, 3, 4, 6, 7, 10-12)
 Joe Costa — recording assistant
 Tom Harding — additional recording
 Ed Seay — production (tracks 2, 5, 8, 9)
 Billy Sherrill — mixing
 Paul Worley — production (tracks 2, 5, 8, 9)

References

1996 albums
Highway 101 albums